The Water Margin, also known Outlaws of the Marsh and Seven Blows Of The Dragon, is a 1972 Hong Kong film adapted from the Chinese classical 14th-century novel Water Margin. It was produced by the Shaw Brothers Studio and directed by Chang Cheh.

Plot
The plot is based on the story of how "Jade Unicorn" Lu Junyi came to join the outlaw band at Liangshan Marsh and the outlaws' battle with the Zeng Family Fortress.

Liangshan's chief Chao Gai was ambushed and killed by Shi Wengong. His fellows vow to avenge him. The current de facto leaders of Liangshan, Song Jiang and Wu Yong, decide that given Shi Wengong's skill, Lu Junyi (Shi's former fellow student) will be the best person to assist them in taking revenge. The outlaws also note that if they succeed in recruiting Lu Junyi, they will also win over Lu's servant, Yan Qing, who is also a formidable martial artist.

Wu Yong disguises himself as fortune teller and infiltrates the northern capital, where Lu Junyi stays, together with Li Kui, who is disguised as his idiotic assistant. They visit Lu Junyi and lie to him that a great calamity will befall him if he does not travel 1,000 miles to the southeast. Lu Junyi is skeptical of the advice and asks Yan Qing for his opinion. By then, Yan Qing has recognized Li Kui and provokes the hot-tempered Li into a fight. Li Kui is defeated and confined together with Wu Yong. Wu Yong uses reverse psychology on Lu Junyi and manages to persuade Lu to release them. Just then, Lu Junyi's steward Li Gu, who is in a secret affair with Lu's wife, reports the outlaws' presence to the authorities so as to seize his master's fortune. When soldiers arrive to capture the outlaws, Lu Junyi orders Yan Qing to escort Wu Yong and Li Kui safely out while he confronts the soldiers and is arrested. Yan Qing attempts to free Lu Junyi from prison but Lu is captured again when Yan leaves him for a short while.

Yan Qing travels to Liangshan to seek help and he attempts to rob two men for his travel expenses. The two men turn out to be actually outlaws from Liangshan, one of them being Shi Xiu. Shi Xiu goes to find Lu Junyi while his companion brings Yan Qing back to Liangshan. While in the city, Shi Xiu sees that Lu Junyi is about to be executed in the market square so he storms the area alone in an attempt to free Lu. Both Lu Junyi and Shi Xiu are eventually overwhelmed by soldiers and taken into captive.

Meanwhile, Yan Qing meets the Liangshan outlaws and they plan to infiltrate the northern capital to save Lu Junyi and Shi Xiu. They take strategic positions around the execution ground and attack the soldiers when the prisoners are about to be beheaded. This time, the outlaws overpower the guards and swiftly take control of the area. Accompanied by the outlaws, Lu Junyi marches home and kills his disloyal steward Li Gu while his adulterous wife is slain by Yan Qing.

As the outlaws leave the city, they run into Shi Wengong and his men, resulting in both sides clashing in an immense battle. Shi Wengong's forces are routed so he challenges the outlaws to engage him and his five students in man-on-man duels. The five students fight with Lin Chong, Li Kui, Hu Sanniang, Wu Song and Shi Xiu, while Lu Junyi faces Shi Wengong. By the time the five heroes had defeated Shi Wengong's students, Lu Junyi was still locked his duel with Shi. Yan Qing and Li Kui join in the fray and Shi Wengong is injured gravely but still remains alive. After declaring that Lu Junyi is now the new leader of Liangshan, Shi Wengong stops everyone from approaching and commits suicide. The outlaws, seeing that their quest for vengeance is now complete, ride back to their stronghold and the film ends.

Cast

David Chiang as Yan Qing
Tetsurō Tamba as Lu Junyi
Toshio Kurosawa as Shi Wengong
Tung Lam as Chao Gai
Ku Feng as Song Jiang
Chin Feng as Wu Yong
Elliot Ngok as Lin Chong
Wong Chung as Shi Xiu
Ti Lung as Wu Song
Lily Ho as Hu Sanniang
Fan Mei-sheng as Li Kui
Wu Ma as Shi Qian
Cheng Lui as Wang Ying
Paul Chun as Hua Rong
Chen Kuan-tai as Shi Jin
Danny Lee as Zhang Shun
Wu Chi-chin as Yang Xiong
Lee Hang as Dai Zong
Lau Dan as Lei Heng
Lei Lung as Qin Ming
Pang Pang as Lu Zhishen
Zhang Yang as Chai Jin
Leung Seung-wan as Liu Tang
Lo Wai as Zhu Tong
Ho Hon-chau as Zhang Heng
Tin Ching as Li Gu
Ling Ling as Madam Jia (Lu Junyi's wife)
Ruby Siu Siu as Xu Hong
Woo Wai as Cai Fu
Yeung Chak-lam as Cai Qing
Liu Wai as Dong Chao
Lee Man-tai as Xue Ba
Lee Wan-chung as Grand Secretary Liang Shijie
Shum Lo as chief clerk
Wong Ching-ho as court clerk
Nam Seok-hun as Wen Da
Lau Gong as Li Cheng
Cheng Miu as Zeng Nong
Tong Yim-chan as Zeng Sheng
Wang Kuang-yu as Zeng Mi
Wong Pau-gei as Zeng Suo
Chan Chuen as Zeng Kui
Cheung Ban as Zeng Tu
Nam Wai-lit as chief wrestler
Gai Yuen as wrestler
Wong Ching as wrestler
Cheung Hei as old man
Tsang Choh-lam as innkeeper
Chin Chun as Lu Junyi's servant
Ko Fei as Lu Junyi's servant
Sai Gwa-pau as Lu Junyi's servant
Fuk Yan-cheng as Lu Junyi's servant
Ko Hung as Lu Junyi's servant / bandit
Huang Ha as Lu Junyi's servant / Zeng militiaman
Yeung Pak-chan as Lu Junyi's servant / Zeng militiaman
Yuen Shun-yee as Zeng militiaman
Law Keung as Zeng militiaman
Ho Bo-sing as Zeng militiaman
Fung Hap-so as Zeng militiaman
Yee Kwan as constable
Yi Fung as constable
Chui Fat as constable
Chow Kong as constable
Chow Yun-gin as constable
Chan Dik-hak as constable
Tam Bo as constable
Kong Chuen as constable
Cheung Chi-ping as constable
Ling Hon as constable carrying execution placard
Tung Choi-bo as constable / Zeng militiaman
Lau Jun-fai as soldier
San Kuai as  bandit
Lee Wan-miu as wrestling spectator
To Wing-leung as wrestling spectator
Chai Lam as wrestling spectator
Gam Tin-chue as wrestling spectator
Bak Yu as mamasan
Yen Shi-kwan
Yuen Cheung-yan
Wong Cheung
Fung Hak-on
Ho Kei-cheong
Fung Ming

Release
The film was bought for release in the US by New World Pictures. Roger Corman cut out a third of the film, had the Shaw brothers shoot an additional sex scene and added a new narration.

See also
The Water Margin (1973 TV series)
Outlaws of the Marsh (TV series)
The Water Margin (1998 TV series)
All Men Are Brothers (TV series)

References

External links

1972 films
1970s action films
Hong Kong martial arts films
1970s Mandarin-language films
Wuxia films
Films directed by Chang Cheh
Shaw Brothers Studio films
Films based on Water Margin
New World Pictures films
1970s Hong Kong films